View of the Domaine Saint-Joseph (French: Vue du Domaine Saint-Joseph) is a painting by French artist Paul Cézanne. Another name given to the work is La Colline des pauvres ("The Poorhouse on The Hill").

Cézanne painted the work in the 1880s. It was exhibited in the Armory Show of 1913 and was purchased by the Metropolitan Museum of Art for the highest price paid by any gallery for a work at the Armory Show.

See also
List of paintings by Paul Cézanne

References

Paintings by Paul Cézanne
Paintings in the collection of the Metropolitan Museum of Art